Paddy Mackey (1889 – 29 January 1948) was an Irish dual player. He played both hurling and Gaelic football with his local club New Ross and with the Wexford senior inter-county teams in both codes in the 1900s and 1910s.

Playing career

Club
Mackey played his club hurling and football with his local club in New Ross.  He first tasted success in 1913 when he won a senior county hurling championship title.  Two years later in 1915 Mackey added to his collection when he won a county football championship title.

Inter-county
Mackey first came to prominence on the inter-county scene as a member of the Wexford senior hurling team.  In 1910 he won his first Leinster hurling title as Wexford overcame Dublin by 3-3 to 1-1.  Unusually, the All-Ireland series of games began before the provincial championships were completed.  As a result of this Kilkenny and Dublin represented Leinster in the All-Ireland quarter-final and semi-final respectively, however, Wexford lined out in the subsequent All-Ireland final.  Limerick provided the opposition on that occasion and an entertaining contest unfolded.  New rules regarding the parallelogram confused the players and Limerick had two goals disallowed because of a ‘square ball.’  Wexford had a goal disallowed for the same reason; however, they still went on to win the game by 7-0 to 6-2.  It was Mackey’s first All-Ireland medal.

Three years after this Mackey was a star player on the Wexford senior football team.  He won a Leinster football title in 1913 with a one point victory over Louth.  Wexford later disposed of Antrim to set up an All-Ireland final meeting with Kerry.  After a low-scoring contest it was the men from ‘the Kingdom’ who emerged victorious by 2-2 to 0-3.

Mackey captured a second Leinster medal in 1914 as Wexford trounced Louth in the provincial decider.  Monaghan were equally disposed of in the penultimate game of the championship, allowing Wexford to advance to a second successive All-Ireland final.  Kerry were the opponents once again, however, Wexford played great football.  They led by 0-6 to 0-1, however, Kerry fought back to secure a 1-3 to 0-6 draw.  The replay drew a crowd of 20,000 to Croke Park and, once again, Wexford took the lead.  Kerry fought back again and went on to win the game by 2-3 to 0-6.

1915 saw Mackey add a third Leinster title to his collection after two matches against Dublin.  After disposing of Cavan in the All-Ireland semi-final Wexford lined out against Kerry in the championship decider.  It was the third successive meeting of these two teams with the Munster men looking for a third title in-a-row.  Dick Fitzgerald of Kerry missed two great goal chances while Wexford were well on top.  In the end Mackey’s side won by 2-4 to 2-1.  It was his first All-Ireland football medal.  On that occasion Mackey, along with his teammate Seán O'Kennedy, jointly became the fourth players in history to have All-Ireland medals in both hurling and football.

Wexford continued their winning ways in 1916 with Mackey collecting a fourth successive Leinster football title.  Kildare were defeated on that occasion, however, Mackey ended up on the losing side in the Leinster hurling decider.  Wexford later breezed through the All-Ireland series and qualified for a fourth successive All-Ireland final.  Because of the Easter Rising and subsequent martial law the game was postponed until the Sunday before Christmas.  Overnight frost resulted in the pitch being extremely hard; however, the game went ahead nonetheless.  Mayo were the opponents on the occasion, however, Wexford were too strong and won the game by 2-4 to 1-2.  It was Mackey’s second All-Ireland football medal.

Wexford maintained their provincial dominance in 1917 with Mackey winning a fifth Leinster title following a two-point win over ‘the Dubs’.  Once again the All-Ireland final beckoned with Clare providing the opposition on this occasion.  It was a unique pairing in football terms and Wexford went on to record an easy victory.  A score line of 0-9 to 0-5 gave Mackey a third consecutive All-Ireland medal.

1918 proved to be another successful year for Mackey in both codes.  Wexford were the masters of provincial football once again as they defeated Louth by four points.  It was Mackey’s sixth consecutive Leinster football medal.  He also had success on the hurling field this year as Wexford defeated Dublin giving Mackey a second Leinster hurling title.  Both the hurlers and footballers were successful in the subsequent series of games and reached the All-Ireland final.  The All-Ireland football final saw Wexford take on Tipperary in yet another novel encounter.  A close-scoring game saw Wexford just about secure a victory by 0-5 to 0-4.  It was Mackey’s fourth All-Ireland medal and an unparalleled record fourth title in-a-row for Wexford.  The All-Ireland hurling final also gave Wexford the chance of joining Cork and Tipperary in the unique situation of being double All-Ireland winners.  That game saw Limerick provide the opposition, however, the hurlers were not able to match the Munster men’s scoring skills.  A score line of 9-5 to 1-3 gave victory to Limerick.

A seventh Leinster football title in-a-row proved beyond this Wexford team while the hurlers also gave up their provincial crown.  Mackey retired from inter-county activities shortly afterwards.

1889 births
1948 deaths
Dual players
Wexford inter-county hurlers
New Ross Gaelic footballers
Wexford inter-county Gaelic footballers
New Ross hurlers
All-Ireland Senior Hurling Championship winners
Kilkenny hurlers
Place of birth missing
Kilkenny Gaelic footballers